Veniamin Ivanovich Kondratyev (born 1 September 1970) is the governor of Krasnodar Krai in the southern European part of Russia.

Biography
In 1993 he graduated from the Kuban State University as a philologist and teacher of the Russian language, in 1995, the same university as a lawyer.

In the public service since 1994. He worked in the Jurist Department of the administration of Krasnodar Krai from 1994 to 1995, from 1995 – in the Lawyer Department of the administration of Krasnodar Krai. From 2001 to 2003 – Deputy chief of staff, head of the Lawyer Department of administration of Krasnodar region. 

Since August 2003 he worked as Deputy head of administration of Krasnodar Krai on issues of property, land and legal relations. Since 30 July 2014 at work in the Main office of the Federal property of the Russian Federation the administration of the President of the Russian Federation. 

January 2015 – the head of the Main Department of Federal property management Department of the President of the Russian Federation, 12 March 2015 – Deputy Manager of the President of the Russian Federation.

On 22 April 2015, by decree of the President of Russia, Kondratyev was appointed as the acting head of administration (Governor) of Krasnodar Krai.

On 14 September 2015, Kondratyev was elected Governor, with nearly 84% of the vote.

Personal life
Kondratyev is married and has 2 children.

References

Links
 Veniamin Kondratyev on VK
 Veniamin Kondratyev on Facebook
 Veniamin Kondratyev on Twitter
 Biography of Veniamin Kondratyev on the Official website of Krasnodar Krai

1970 births
Governors of Krasnodar Krai
Living people
People from Prokopyevsk
United Russia politicians
21st-century Russian politicians